Arthur Vincent (born 30 September 1999) is a French rugby union player. His position is centre and he currently plays for Montpellier in the Top 14.

International career

International tries

International honours

France (U20)
Six Nations Under 20s Championship winners: 2018
World Rugby Under 20 Championship winners (2): 2018, 2019

References

External links
France profile at FFR
Montpellier HR profile
L'Équipe profile

1999 births
Living people
French rugby union players
France international rugby union players
Montpellier Hérault Rugby players
Rugby union centres